Richard Hely Hely-Hutchinson, 1st Earl of Donoughmore (29 January 1756 – 22 August 1825), styled The Honourable Richard Hely-Hutchinson from 1783 to 1788, was an Irish peer and politician.

Biography

He was the son of Rt. Hon. John Hely-Hutchinson and Christiana Hely-Hutchinson, 1st Baroness Donoughmore. In 1776, he stood as Member of Parliament in the Irish House of Commons for two different constituencies. He sat for Dublin University to 1778 and Sligo Borough to 1783. Subsequently, he represented Taghmon, County Wexford, from 1783 until 1788, when he succeeded to his mother's title. In 1789, he was elected Grandmaster of the Grand Lodge of Ireland, a post he held until 1813.

He commissioned the building c.1790 of the Georgian style Knocklofty House near Clonmel in County Tipperary. He was created Viscount Donoughmore, of Knocklofty, Co. Tipperary (Peerage of Ireland), on 20 November 1797, with a special remainder to his mother's male descendants and, in 1800, Earl of Donoughmore.  He was one of the original 28 Irish Representative peers and an advocate of Roman Catholic emancipation. He was created, in 1821, Viscount Hutchinson (in the Peerage of the United Kingdom) and thus gained an hereditary seat in the House of Lords.

He held the office of Governor of Tipperary and of Lord Treasurer's Remembrancer Court of Exchequer (Ireland). He gained the rank of Lieutenant-General.

References

thepeerage.com

External links

|-

1756 births
1825 deaths
Peers of the United Kingdom created by George IV
Irish representative peers
Irish MPs 1776–1783
Irish MPs 1783–1790
Politicians from County Tipperary
Members of the Privy Council of Ireland
Richard
Members of the Irish House of Lords
Members of the Parliament of Ireland (pre-1801) for Dublin University
Members of the Parliament of Ireland (pre-1801) for County Sligo constituencies
Members of the Parliament of Ireland (pre-1801) for County Wexford constituencies
Earls of Donoughmore